Norman or Norm Mason may refer to:

Norman Mason (American musician) (before 1900–after 1969), American jazz multi-instrumentalist and bandleader
Norm Mason (1914–1996), Australian rules footballer who played with South Melbourne
Norman Byron Mason (1938–2006), Canadian blues musician whose stage name was Dutch Mason
Norman Mason (canoeist) (born 1952), British competitor at 1976 Summer Olympics